Big Bang is the seventh album from Latin rock band Enanitos Verdes released on August 15, 1994. "Lamento Boliviano" was released as a single.

Track listing 

 Mejor no hablemos de amor [Better Not Talk About Love]
 Lamento boliviano [Bolivian Lament]
 Celdas [Cells]
 Yo pagaría [I Would Pay]
 Piel de nopal [Nopal Skin]
 H.I.V.
 Mi primer día sin ti [My First Day Without You]
 Creo [I Believe]
 Resplandor de afecto [Glow Of Affection]
 Cuando habla el corazón [When The Heart Speaks]
 Bailarina [Dancer]
 Pasaré por tí [I'll Pick You Up]
 Estoy dispuesto [I Am Willing]

External links 

1994 albums
Enanitos Verdes albums